Carl Vezerfi-Clemm (March 15, 1939 in Budapest, Hungary – February 17, 2012 in Munich, (Germany)) was a German sculptor, medalist and coin designer. He made commemorative coins issued by the Federal Republic of Germany, medals, sculptures and other creations.

Biography 
The young Carl Vezerfi-Clemm lived in Budapest (Hungary). From 1958 til 1962 he studied sculpture and painting at the Hungarian University of Fine Arts Budapest.

Since 1966 he lived in Munich, West Germany. From 1967 to 1974 he was a conservator at the Staatlichen Antikensammlungen and the Glyptothek in Munich. From 1974 to 1982 he worked as a medalist for a private mint in Munich. Since 1983 he was a freelance artist.

Carl Veterfi-Clemm was a member of the Kuenstlerkreis der Medailleure München (Artist Circle of Medalists Munich) since its foundation in 1988. Sculptors and medalists, proven in trials of coin design, joined this circle.

Carl Vezerfi-Clemm died at February 17, 2012 in his apartment in Munich after a long sickness. According to his will, his ashes were buried in silence in an unmarked grave at the Ostfriedhof (East Cemetery) in Munich.

Creations 
Carl Verzerfi-Clemm made commemorative coins issued by the Federal Republic of Germany, medals, sculptures and other creations such as sculptures for the Nymphenburg Porcelain Manufactory.

Commemorative coins issued by the Federal Republic of Germany 
Carl Vezerfi-Clemm designed following commemorative coins issued by the Federal Republic of Germany:

5 DM commemorative coins 
 Material: 75% copper, 25% nickel with pure nickel core
 Coin diameter: 29 mm
 Weight: 10 g

500th birthday of Martin Luther 

 Obverse: Denomination
 Reverse: Martin Luther (1483–1546), reformer, after a painting of Lucas Cranach
 Edge inscription: “GOTTES WORT BLEIBT IN EWIGKEIT“
 Design and model: Carl Vezefi-Clemm
 Issued: November 10, 1983
 Mint: G, Badisches Muenzamt Karlsruhe
 Mint state (MS): 8000000 issues; Proof (PR): 350000 issues
 World Coin Catalogue No. 158, Jaeger No.: 434

175th Birthday of Felix Mendelssohn Bartholdy (1984) 

 Obverse: Denomination
 Reverse: Jacob Ludwig Felix Mendelssohn Bartholdy (1809–1847), the composer and in background a sheet music section of the overture to "A Midsummer Night's Dream".
 Edge inscription: “IHR TOENE SCHWINGT EUCH FREUDIG DURCH DIE SAITEN”
 Design and model: Carl Vezefi-Clemm
 Issued: October 20, 1984.
 Mint J, Hamburgische Muenze
 Mint state (MS): 8000000 issues; Proof (PR): 350000 issues
 World Coin Catalogue No. 160, Jaeger No.: 436

200th death anniversary of Frederick the Great (1986) 
- Last 5 DM commemorative coin -.

 Obverse: Denomination
 Reverse: Frederick II (1712–1786), Elector of Brandenburg, King of Prussia.
 Edge inscription: "ICH BIN DER ERSTE DIENER MEINES STAATES".
 Design and model: Carl Vezefi-Clemm
 Issued: October 22, 1986.
 Mint F,  Wuerttembergisches Muenzamt Stuttgart.
 Mint state (MS): 8000000 issues; Proof (PR): 350000 issues
 World Coin Catalogue No. 164, Jaeger No.: 440

10 DM Commemorative Coins 
 Material: 62.5% fine silver, 37.5% copper
 Coin diameter: 32.5 mm
 Weight: 15.5 g

100th death anniversary of Carl Zeiss (1988) 

 Obverse: Denomination
 Reverse: Carl Zeiss (1816–1888), German maker of optical instruments with a microscope.
 Edge inscription: "OPTIK FÜR WISSENSCHAFT UND TECHNIK".
 Design and model: Carl Vezefi-Clemm
 Issued: October 23, 1988.
 Mint F,  Wuerttembergisches Muenzamt Stuttgart.
 Mint state (MS): 8000000 issues; Proof (PR): 350000 issues
 World Coin Catalogue No. 169, Jaeger No.: 444

900th birthday of Hildegard of Bingen (1998) 

 Obverse: Denomination
 Reverse: Hildegard of Bingen (1098–1179), writing the book (Liber), "Sci vias Domini", inspired by the hand of the Lord.
 Edge inscription: "WISSE DIE WEGE DES HERRN".
 Design and model: Carl Vezefi-Clemm
 Issued: October 16, 1998.
 Mint state (MS):
 Mint G, Badisches Muenzamt Karlsruhe: 3500000 issues
 Proof (PR):
 Mint A, Preussische Staatsmuenze Berlin: 200000 issues
 Mint D, Bayerisches Hauptmuenzamt, Muenchen: 200000 issues
 Mint F, Wuerttembergisches Muenzamt Stuttgart: 200000 issues
 Mint G, Badisches Muenzamt Karlsruhe: 200000 issues
 Mint J, Hamburgische Muenze: 200000 issues
 World Coin Catalogue  No. 192, Jaeger No.: 468

Footnotes

References 
 Paul Arnold, Harald Kuethmann, Dirk Steinhilber: Deutsche Muenzen, Katalog von 1800 bis 1985. Muenchen 1985, 
 Wolfgang Steguweit: Katalog der Gedenkmuenzen Deutschlands 1952 – 2005 in Gerd Dethlefs und Wolfgang Steguweit (Hrsg.): GeldKunst KunstGeld, Deutsche Gedenkmuenzen seit 1949, Gestaltung und Gestalter. Osnabrueck 2005, 
 Manfred Pfefferkorn: Zwischen Germanischem Museum und Brandenburger Tor, 40 Jahr Deutsche Gedenkmuenzen. Ostfildern 1993, 
 Guenter Schoen, Gerhard Schoen: Kleiner Deutscher Muenzkatalog, von 1871 bis heute. 41. Auflage, Muenchen 2011,

External links 
 
 
 Deutsche Gesellschaft fuer Medaillenkunst e.V.
 Staatliche Muenzsammlung Muenchen, Der Kuenstlerkreis der Medailleure Muenchen 

1939 births
2012 deaths
20th-century German sculptors
20th-century German male artists
German male sculptors
21st-century German sculptors
21st-century German male artists
German medallists
Artists from Munich
Burials at the Ostfriedhof (Munich)
Hungarian University of Fine Arts alumni